Arnold Alcolea Nuñez (born 25 April 1982) is a Cuban former racing cyclist who competed at the 2012 Summer Olympics, and at the 2014 Central American and Caribbean Games in Veracruz, Mexico. In 2006 and 2011 he was both the Cuban Road Race Champion and Time Trial Champion. He was born in Santiago de Cuba.

Major results

2001
 3rd Time trial, National Road Championships
2003
 1st Stage 2 Vuelta a Cuba
2005
 1st Stage 10b Vuelta a Venezuela
 2nd Time trial, National Road Championships
 7th Overall Vuelta a Cuba
2006
 National Road Championships
1st  Road race
1st  Time trial
 6th Overall Vuelta a Cuba
1st Mountains classification
2007
 1st Stage 13 Vuelta al Táchira
 6th Overall Vuelta a Cuba
 7th Overall Vuelta Ciclista a Costa Rica
1st Stages 6 & 7
2008
 3rd Overall Vuelta Ciclista a Costa Rica
1st Stage 5
 5th Overall Vuelta Ciclista Chiapas
 7th Overall Vuelta a Cuba
 8th Overall Vuelta a la Independencia Nacional
2009
 1st Overall Vuelta a Cuba
1st Stage 8
2010
 National Road Championships
1st  Time trial
2nd Road race
 1st Overall Vuelta a Cuba
 1st Stage 4 Vuelta Ciclista Chiapas
 Pan American Road Championships
2nd  Road race
5th Time trial
 3rd 2009–10 UCI America Tour
 6th Overall Vuelta a Venezuela
 9th Overall Tour de San Luis
 10th Overall Vuelta Ciclista a Costa Rica
1st Stage 5
2011
 National Road Championships
1st  Road race
1st  Time trial
 Pan American Games
3rd Road race
10th Time trial
 Pan American Road Championships
9th Road race
10th Time trial
2012
 2nd Road race, National Road Championships
 7th Overall Vuelta Mexico Telmex
 7th Overall Vuelta Ciclista a Costa Rica
1st Stage 11
2013
 6th Road race, Pan American Road Championships
2014
 National Road Championships
1st  Road race
2nd Time trial
 1st  Sprints classification Vuelta Ciclista a Costa Rica
 Central American and Caribbean Games
2nd Points race
5th Road race

References

External links

1982 births
Living people
Cuban male cyclists
Olympic cyclists of Cuba
Cyclists at the 2012 Summer Olympics
Cyclists at the 2011 Pan American Games
Pan American Games bronze medalists for Cuba
Pan American Games medalists in cycling
Central American and Caribbean Games silver medalists for Cuba
Competitors at the 2014 Central American and Caribbean Games
Central American and Caribbean Games medalists in cycling
Medalists at the 2011 Pan American Games
Competitors at the 2006 Central American and Caribbean Games